The Hispaniola pupfish (Cyprinodon bondi) is a fish endemic to the lakes of Etang Saumâtre and Lake Enriquillo on the island of Hispaniola, in both Haiti and the Dominican Republic.

Taxonomic history
George S. Myers wrote its species description in 1935. Its holotype was deposited at the National Museum of Natural History. The type locality of the fish is Étang Saumâtre, Haiti. Myers named this species after R. M. Bond, who collected the specimens Myers used for his description.

Description

Distribution
The fish's holotype and paratypes were all collected in Étang Saumâtre, Haiti. Michael Leonard Smith writes this species is endemic to this lake, on the border of Haiti and the Dominican Republic; some specimens collected from Lago Enriquillo had been identified as being C. bondi, but Smith argues that this identification was mistaken.

References

Further reading

External links

Taxa named by George S. Myers
Fish described in 1935
Cyprinodon
Endemic fauna of Hispaniola
Fish of the Dominican Republic